Andreas Kramer (born 13 April 1997) is a Swedish middle-distance runner specialising in the 800 metres. He won the silver medal at the 2018 European Championships. With the performance of 1:49.62 he is the current European junior indoor record holder.

Competition record

Personal bests
Outdoor
800 metres – 1:44.47 NR (Ostrava 2020)
1000 metres – 2:22.20 (Gothenburg 2015)
1500 metres – 3:47.28 (Stockholm 2015)
Indoor
400 metres – 47.75 (Ulsteinvik 2019)
800 metres – 1:46.52 (Karlsrue 2019)
1500 metres – 3:46.62 (Sätra 2017)

References

External links
 

1997 births
Living people
Swedish male middle-distance runners
Place of birth missing (living people)
World Athletics Championships athletes for Sweden
Swedish Athletics Championships winners
Athletes (track and field) at the 2020 Summer Olympics
Olympic athletes of Sweden
21st-century Swedish people